Músíktilraunir is an annual music competition held in Reykjavík, Iceland.

Winners 

 1982 – Dron
 1983 – Dúkkulísurnar
 1984 – not held due to teachers' strike
 1985 – Gipsy
 1986 – Greifarnir
 1987 – Stuðkompaníið
 1988 – Jójó
 1989 – Laglausir
 1990 – Nabblastrengir (A.K.A.: Umbilical cords)
 1991 – Infusoria (A.K.A.: Sororicide)
 1992 – Kolrassa Krókríðandi (later became Bellatrix)
 1993 – Yukatan
 1994 – Maus
 1995 – Botnleðja (A.K.A.: Silt)
 1996 – Stjörnukisi
 1997 – Soðin Fiðla
 1998 – Stæner
 1999 – Mínus
 2000 – 110 Rottweiler hundar (later became XXX Rottweiler hundar)
 2001 – Andlát
 2002 – Búdrýgindi
 2003 – Dáðadrengir
 2004 – Mammút
 2005 – Jakobínarína
 2006 – The Foreign Monkeys
 2007 – Shogun
 2008 – Agent Fresco
 2009 – Bróðir Svartúlfs
 2010 – Of Monsters and Men
 2011 – Samaris
 2012 – RetRoBot
 2013 – Vök
 2014 – Vio
 2015 – Rythmatik
 2016 – Hórmónar
 2017 – 
 2018 – Ateria
 2019 – Blóðmör
 2020 – no contest held due to COVID-19
 2021 – Ólafur Kram

References

External links 
  
  

Music competitions